Neatx is an open-source NX server based on NoMachine's NX technology. It is created by Google. Neatx is written mostly in Python, with the exception of very few wrapper scripts in bash and one program written in C. Neatx is free and open-source software, subject to the requirements of the GNU General Public License (GPL), version 2.

History 
Google announced the release of Neatx on July 7, 2009; there is no longer any active development on the project.

The source repository was last updated in February 2010.

See also 
 Comparison of remote desktop software
 Remmina

References

Further reading

External links 
 Google Code page for Neatx
 Official Google blog post announcing the release
 The FreeNX Stable PPA (repository) for Ubuntu also features Neatx for Ubuntu releases 9.10 and 10.04

Google
Internet software for Linux
Remote desktop